Summersdale Publishers Ltd (often simply Summersdale) is an English independent publishing firm of non-fiction. The company is based in Chichester, West Sussex.

Founded in 1990 by Stewart Ferris and Alastair Williams, it has since published over 800 titles, and has an output of around 90 books per year.

Publishing philosophy
To seek out potential trade bestsellers in the following genres: travel literature, humour, self help, and general non fiction.

Authors
David Baboulene
Bidisha
Edward Enfield
Caro Feely
Stewart Ferris
Peter Kerr
Imogen Lloyd Webber
Anna Nicholas
Geoff Thompson
Reza Pakravan

Other media activities
Audiobooks
E-books

References

External links
Summersdale Media website

Companies based in West Sussex
Literature of England
Book publishing companies of the United Kingdom
Publishing companies established in 1997